A Perfect Absolution is the fourth studio album by French death metal band Gorod. The album was released in March 2012 under Listenable Records and is the band's first full-length album with vocalist Julien Deyres.

Track list

Credits
Julien Deyres - vocals
Mathieu Pascal - guitar, production, engineering
Nicolas Alberny - guitar
Benoit Claus - bass
Samuel Santiago - drums
Frédéric Motte - mixing, mastering
Yohann Huhner - cover art, layout

Guests: 
Xavier Bertrand - Additional vocals on "Birds of Sulphur" and "The Axe of God"
Michael Keene - Second guitar solo on "The Axe of God"
Guillaume Martinot - Additional vocals on "Birds of Sulphur" and "The Axe of God"
Christian Müenzner - Guitar solo on "Carved in the Wind"

References 

2012 albums
Listenable Records albums
Unique Leader Records albums
Gorod (band) albums